The Frisians (Saterland Frisian: Do Fräisen) is a regionalist political party in the state of Lower Saxony in Germany, seeking to promote the interests of the Frisian minority ethnic group in Germany.

The party seeks self-determination. Their political policies include: the introduction of Low German as a compulsory subject in schools.

Die Friesen was a member of the European Free Alliance until 2018.

See also
 East Frisia
 East Frisian Low Saxon
 East Frisians
 Frisia
 Frisians
 Frisian languages

References

Political parties established in 2007
Political parties of minorities in Germany
Regional parties in Germany
Separatism in Germany
European Free Alliance
2007 establishments in Germany